Fakhrul Hasan Boiragi is a Bangladesh actor and director who has acted in films and TV dramas and worked as assistant director in movies like Ki Je Kori (1976), Razia Sultana (1984), Prem Juddho (1994) and acted in films like Surjo Dighol Bari (1979), Suruj Mia (1984), Dahan (1985) and Moroner Pore (1990) etc. On 7 August 2016, his wife Razia Hassan filed a missing diary as he was missing for 40 days. Later, he was rescued.

Awards
 Bachsas Award for Best Supporting Actor - 1984 for Suruj Mia

Filmography
Director
Seyana (1976)
Shopno (1991)
Shudhu Tomari (1995)

References

External links
 

Bangladeshi male television actors
Bangladeshi male film actors
Living people
Date of birth missing (living people)
Bangladeshi film directors
Year of birth missing (living people)